Air Command International, Inc. is an American aircraft manufacturer originally based in Wylie, Texas, later in Caddo Mills, Texas and now in River Falls, Wisconsin. The company specializes in the design and manufacture of autogyros in the form of kits for amateur construction for the US FAR 103 Ultralight Vehicles and the US Experimental - Amateur-built aircraft categories.

The company was founded by Dennis Fetters, who later went on to start the troubled Revolution Helicopter Corporation in Excelsior Springs, Missouri and Fetters Aerospace in China.

The Air Command Commander was introduced by the company in 1984 for the US FAR 103 Ultralight Vehicles category. Follow-up models included the single-seat Air Command Commander Elite, the single seat Air Command Commander Sport and Air Command Single Place, plus the  two-seat Air Command Commander 147A, two seat Air Command Commander Side-By-Side, two seat Air Command Commander Tandem and two seat Air Command Tandem, all for the US homebuilt aircraft category.

In 1998 the company was employing Skywheels rotor blades, but changed to McCutchen. In about 2004 the company switched from using McCutchen rotor blades to using Dragon Wings rotor blades.

Aircraft

References

External links 

Aircraft manufacturers of the United States
Autogyros
Homebuilt aircraft